The New York Stakes is a Grade I American thoroughbred horse race for fillies and mares aged four-years-old and older run over a distance of one and one-quarter  miles on the turf scheduled annually in early June at Belmont Park in Elmont, New York. The current purse is $750,000.

History

Prior to 1962 the race was open to horses of either sex. For 1972 only, it was restricted to three-year-old fillies.

Inaugurated in 1940 as the New York Handicap at Aqueduct Racetrack, it was moved to Belmont Park in 1961 but returned to Aqueduct in 1963 where it remained until 1975 when it was shifted permanently to Belmont Park. Since its inception, it has been contested at various distances on both dirt and turf:
  miles : 1940–1950 on dirt
  miles : 1951–1954 on dirt
  miles : 1959–1960 on turf
  miles : 1955–1956, 1958, 1961, on turf
  miles : 1963–1964, 1968–1971, on turf
  miles : 1965–1967, 1977–1979, on turf
 7 furlongs : 1972, on dirt
  miles : 1980 to present, on turf

There was no race run in 1957 and 1973–1975.

The race was run in two divisions in 1960, 1965, 1966, 1969, 1970, 1971, and 1978.

In 2009, due to heavy rains, the race was taken off the turf and shortened from 1 and 1/4 miles to 1 and 1/8 miles.

In 2015, the date for the race was moved to the Friday before the Belmont Stakes as part of the Belmont Racing Festival. For 2016, the purse was increased to $500,000.

In 2022 the event was upgraded to Grade I.

Records
Speed  record: (At current distance of  miles on turf)
 1:58.40 – Capades (1990)

Most wins:
 2 – Blue Thor (1963, 1965)
 2 – Batteur (1964, 1965)

Most wins by an owner:
 3 – Joan & John Phillips and/or Darby Dan Farm (1992, 1999, 2004)
 3 - Peter M. Brant (1980, 2019, 2022)

Most wins by a jockey:
 4 – Eddie Arcaro (1947, 1951, 1952, 1953)
 4 – Ángel Cordero Jr. (1976, 1981, 1990, 1991)
 4 – Jerry Bailey (1985, 1994, 2000, 2005)

Most wins by a trainer:

 4 – Christophe Clement (2001, 2008, 2011, 2012)
 4 – Chad C. Brown (2016, 2018, 2019, 2022)

Winners

See also
New York Handicap Triple

References

 The 2008 New York Stakes at the NTRA
 Video at YouTube of the 2008 New York Stakes

Middle distance horse races for fillies and mares
Graded stakes races in the United States
Turf races in the United States
Horse races in New York (state)
Recurring sporting events established in 1940
Belmont Park
1940 establishments in New York (state)
Grade 1 turf stakes races in the United States
Grade 1 stakes races in the United States